Armadillidae is a family of woodlice (Oniscidea; terrestrial crustaceans), comprising around 80 genera and 700 species. It is the largest family of Oniscidea, and one of the most species-rich families of the entire Isopoda. Armadillids generally have a strongly convex body shape, with some rather shallowly convex. Like members of the woodlice family Armadillidiidae, armadillids are capable of enrolling into a sphere (conglobation), and are commonly known as pill bugs. Armadillids differ from the Armadillidiidae in that the antennae are fully enclosed within the sphere.

Species of Armadillidae occur in a variety of habitats including forests, savannas, and arid regions. Armadillids occur natively in the Afrotropics, Asia, Australia, the Neotropics, and the Mediterranean region of Europe. A few poorly-known species occur in North America north of Mexico, and some are introduced.

The family Armadillidae was erected by German naturalist Johann Friedrich von Brandt in 1831, although the earliest named genus now assigned to the family is Armadillo, described by French zoologist André Marie Constant Duméril in 1816. The German zoologist Karl Wilhelm Verhoeff described nearly one quarter of currently recognized genera (17).

Genera
Each genus listed below is followed by the author citation, the biologist(s) who first coined the genus, and the year of its publication.

Acanthodillo Verhoeff, 1926
Acanthoniscus Kinahan, 1859
Aethiopodillo Verhoeff, 1942
Akermania Collinge, 1919
Anchicubaris Collinge, 1920
Annobodillo Schmalfuss & Ferrara, 1983
Anthrodillo Verhoeff, 1946
Armadillo Duméril, 1816
Aulacodillo Verhoeff, 1942
Australiodillo Verhoeff, 1926
Barnardillo Arcangeli, 1934
Barrowdillo Dalens, 1993
Bethalus Budde-Lund, 1909
Buddelundia Michaelsen, 1912
Calendillo Dalens, 1993
Calmanesia Collinge, 1922
Chelomadillo Herold, 1931
Coronadillo Vandel, 1977
Cosmeodillo Vandel, 1972
Cristarmadillo Arcangeli, 1950
Ctenorillo Verhoeff, 1942
Cubaris Brandt, 1834
Cubaroides Vandel, 1973
Cuckoldillo Lewis, 1998
Diploexochus Brandt, 1833
Dryadillo Taiti, Ferrara & Kwon, 1992
Echinodillo Jackson, 1935
Emydodillo Verhoeff, 1926
Ethelumoris Richardson, 1907
Feadillo Schmalfuss & Ferrara, 1983
Filippinodillo Schmalfuss, 1987
Formosillo Verhoeff, 1928
Gabunillo Schmalfuss & Ferrara, 1983
Globarmadillo Richardson, 1910
Glomerulus Budde-Lund, 1904
Hawaiodillo Verhoeff, 1926
Hybodillo Herold, 1931
Kimberleydillo Dalens, 1993
Laureola Barnard, 1960
Leucodillo Vandel, 1973
Lobodillo Herold, 1931
Merulana Budde-Lund, 1913
Merulanella Verhoeff, 1926
Mesodillo Verhoeff, 1926
Myrmecodillo Arcangeli, 1934
Nataldillo Verhoeff, 1942
Neodillo Dalens, 1990
Nesodillo Verhoeff, 1926
Ochetodillo Verhoeff, 1926
Orodillo Verhoeff, 1926
Orthodillo Vandel, 1973
Pachydillo Arcangeli, 1934
Palaeoarmadillo George Poinar Jr, 2018
Papuadillo Vandel, 1973
Parakermania Vandel, 1973
Paraxenodillo Schmalfuss & Ferrara, 1983
Pericephalus Budde-Lund, 1909
Polyacanthus Budde-Lund, 1909
Pseudodiploexochus Arcangeli, 1934
Pseudolaureola Kwon, Ferrara & Taiti, 1992
Pseudolobodillo Schmalfuss & Ferrara, 1983
Pyrgoniscus Kinahan, 1859
Reductoniscus Kesselyak, 1930
Rhodesillo Ferrara & Taiti, 1978
Schismadillo Verhoeff, 1926
Sinodillo Kwon & Taiti, 1993
Sphaerillodillo Arcangeli, 1934
Sphaerilloides Vandel, 1977
Sphenodillo Lewis, 1998
Spherillo Dana, 1853
Stigmops Lillemets & Wilson, 2002
Sumatrillo Herold, 1931
Synarmadillo Dollfus, 1892
Togarmadillo Schmalfuss & Ferrara, 1983
Tongadillo Dalens, 1988
Triadillo Vandel, 1973
Tridentodillo Jackson, 1933
Troglarmadillo Arcangeli, 1957
Troglodillo Jackson, 1937
Tuberillo Schultz, 1982
Venezillo Verhoeff, 1928

References

External links

Woodlice
Crustacean families